Kalinga Institute of Medical Sciences (KIMS) is the medical school of the Kalinga Institute of Industrial Technology situated in Bhubaneswar, Odisha, India. This institute began offering MBBS courses in medical stream courses in 2007.

Its sister institute Kalinga Institute of Dental Sciences (KIDS) offers courses in Dental Science.

History

The idea of a medical college was conceived by Achyuta Samanta. Construction of the college building was completed in 2004, the faculties were appointed. Initially, the hospital was a makeshift facility in the Godown area of the former MAGNETIC company.

In June 2005 the new hospital building was complete. The hospital acquired new equipment like a CT scan.

2006 saw the beginning of the inspection processes by the MCI and in June 2007 KIMS was formally given permission to start MBBS course.

The institute was earlier affiliated to Utkal University, however in 2009 in came under the ambit of KIIT University. In 2013, KIMS got permanent affiliation from Medical Council of India (MCI).

Rankings 
The National Institutional Ranking Framework (NIRF) ranked Kalinga Institute of Medical Sciences 32  overall in India in 2020 among medical rankings.

References

External links
 KIMS home page

Medical colleges in Odisha
Kalinga Institute of Industrial Technology
2007 establishments in Orissa
Educational institutions established in 2007